Glas Koncila is a Croatian, Roman Catholic, weekly newspaper published in Zagreb and distributed throughout the country, as well as among Croats of Bosnia and Herzegovina and Croatian diaspora.

Publishing history 
The newspaper (whose title means "Voice of the Council") began publication on October 4, 1962, at the initiative of the Zagreb Franciscans and based upon a decision made by the archbishop of Zagreb, Franjo Šeper, as a mimeographed bulletin which reported on the events of the Second Vatican Council. During the 1970s newspaper had a circulation of circa 140 000 copies weekly. Newspaper played decisive role in theological discuss following confrontations of various post-Council theological trends.

It was first printed on September 29, 1963, with the motto "The New Face of the Church". The 1963 Christmas edition was printed in 40,000 copies. The publisher was the Archdiocesan Cathedra in Zagreb and the editor-in-chief was the head of this institution. It was issued every two weeks until the end of 1984. In December 1984, the publication's editor Živko Kustić was put under investigation for disseminating "misinformation" and was sentenced to two months in jail the following month.

Since January 1985, Glas Koncila has been a weekly newspaper, published jointly by the archdioceses of Zagreb, Split, Sarajevo, Rijeka and Zadar. From 1987 to 1991, the archdiocese of Belgrade was also one of the publishers. Since 2004, the publisher is again the Archdiocesan Cathedra in Zagreb.

Notable contributors 
Notable contributors include Bonaventura Duda, Celestin Tomić, Vladimir Lončarević, Sonja Tomić, Stjepan Lice, Živko Kustić, Smiljana Rendić, Eva Kirchmayer-Bilić, Tomislav Šagi-Bunić...

References

External links 
 Official website
 Entry in the Croatian encyclopedia

Publications established in 1962
Weekly newspapers published in Croatia
Catholic newspapers
Croatian-language newspapers
Mass media in Zagreb
1962 establishments in Yugoslavia
Newspapers published in Yugoslavia